My Little Pony: Equestria Girls – Legend of Everfree, known simply as Legend of Everfree, is a 2016 flash animated musical fantasy movie sequel to 2015's My Little Pony: Equestria Girls – Friendship Games, written by Kristine Songco and Joanna Lewis, and directed by Ishi Rudell. The movie was produced by DHX Media's 2D animation studio in Vancouver, Canada for Hasbro Studios in the United States as a part of Hasbro's Equestria Girls toy line and media franchise, which is a spin-off of the 2010 relaunch of My Little Pony. Prior to its release in the United States on Netflix on October 1, 2016, the movie was first broadcast on Discovery Kids in Latin America on September 24, 2016. It received a home media release in the United States and Canada on November 1, 2016. The movie received mixed reviews from critics, who praised the animation, voice acting, and music, but criticized its script, plot, and excessive use of too many plotlines all at once.

Like the first three Equestria Girls movies, Legend of Everfree re-envisions the main characters of the parent franchise, normally ponies, as teenage human characters in a high school setting. The movie's plot concerns the students of Canterlot High School attending a field trip to Camp Everfree, which becomes plagued with bizarre magical circumstances relating to a local urban legend.

Legend of Everfree was then followed by three specials, which aired on Discovery Family from June 24 to July 8, 2017.

Plot 

The students of Canterlot High School attend a field trip to Camp Everfree, a nature camp owned by Gloriosa Daisy and her brother, Timber Spruce. During the bus ride, transfer student Twilight Sparkle has a nightmare of being overtaken by "Midnight Sparkle", a malevolent alter ego of herself produced while temporarily corrupted by Equestrian magic. Her friend Sunset Shimmer is supportive, relating through her own similar experience of transforming into a demon. Shortly upon arrival at the camp, Twilight develops telekinetic powers, which she worries is a sign of Midnight's lingering presence.

That night, Timber tells a campfire story about a forest spirit named Gaea Everfree being angered by the camp's construction and threatening to unleash a plague of natural disasters upon it. The next day, a sailboat crashes into a dock the campers are building to use as a fashion show runway. The terrified campers spot glittering gem dust that matches the description of Gaea's presence in Timber's story, convincing them that Gaea is real. Twilight, however, believes her magic to be responsible for the accident and distances herself from her friends.

Later, Twilight's friends begin developing superhuman abilities which they can only use within the camp's boundaries (Rainbow Dash gains super speed, Fluttershy gets the ability to communicate with animals, Pinkie Pie can create explosions using sprinkles, Rarity can make diamonds out of thin air, and Applejack receives super strength). Now believing her magic is infecting her friends, Twilight prepares to run away from the camp. Sunset follows Twilight into the woods and, discovering her power of telepathic empathy, convinces her to stay. As Timber leads them back to the camp, Sunset notices gem dust falling from his pocket and suspects him of staging Gaea's attacks. She later overhears him arguing with Gloriosa to abandon what Sunset assumes to be the camp. Remembering his earlier statements of longing for urban life, Sunset concludes that Timber means to shut the camp down by terrorizing the campers.

Sunset brings Twilight and Spike with her to investigate a nearby cave kept off-limits by Timber, where they find geodes infused with Equestrian magic. The three are confronted by Gloriosa, who reveals herself to be the true cause of the natural disasters. Sunset learns through her visions that Gloriosa, desperate to prevent the camp's closure, has been wearing the geodes as a necklace to harness their power, with the "disasters" resulting from her reckless attempts at using magic to improve the campers' experience; Timber, anticipating this, invented the story of Gaea Everfree to cover for her.

Gloriosa adds more geodes to the necklace and is driven entirely insane by their power, taking on an appearance resembling Gaea. Crashing the campers' fashion show rehearsal, Gloriosa enacts her intent to "protect" them by trapping the camp in a bramble cage. When Sunset's friends fail to stop Gloriosa's psychotic rampage, they encourage Twilight to embrace her magic to assist. Following one final struggle against Midnight, Twilight asserts control of herself and takes the geode necklace apart, freeing Gloriosa from its influence. The geodes become pendants for Twilight and her friends, who gain new magical forms and restore the camp. Still faced with the camp's closure, the girls organize a last-minute fundraiser ball held within the cave. Their plan is a success, attracting a large crowd of former campers and saving the camp.

Cast 

 Tara Strong as Twilight Sparkle, a transfer student at Canterlot High who is haunted by nightmares of Midnight Sparkle, her temporary split personality from the third movie. She gains telekinesis.
 Shoichet performs Twilight Sparkle's singing voice.
 Rebecca Shoichet as Sunset Shimmer, one of Twilight's friends who gains the power to empathetically sense others' thoughts and feelings through physical touch.
 Ashleigh Ball as Rainbow Dash, who gains super speed; and Applejack, who gains super strength.
 Andrea Libman as Pinkie Pie, who can infuse sprinkles with explosive energy; and Fluttershy, who can communicate with animals.
 Shannon Chan-Kent performs Pinkie Pie's singing voice.
 Tabitha St. Germain as Rarity, who can create diamond-like force fields; and Vice Principal Luna, Principal Celestia's younger sister.
 Kazumi Evans performs Rarity's singing voice.
 Cathy Weseluck as Spike, Twilight's talking pet dog.
 Enid-Raye Adams as Gloriosa Daisy, the owner and director of Camp Everfree, and the movie's main antagonist. She is also the sister of Timber Spruce.
 Kelly Metzger performs Gloriosa's singing voice.
 Brian Doe as Timber Spruce, Gloriosa's brother and a camp counselor with whom Twilight is in love.
 Nicole Oliver as Principal Celestia, the head of Canterlot High School.
 Vincent Tong as Flash Sentry, a camper enamored with Twilight's princess counterpart from Equestria who struggles to disassociate the two.
 Brian Drummond as Filthy Rich, a businessman who threatens to replace the camp with a spa resort.

The movie also features minor speaking roles with Michael Dobson as Bulk Biceps; Lee Tockar and Richard Ian Cox as Snips and Snails; Kathleen Barr as Trixie; Tong as Sandalwood; St. Germain as Muffins; Ball as Lyra Heartstrings; and Libman as Sweetie Drops.

Production 
After the third Equestria Girls installment, "Legend of Everfree", was first mentioned in a Hasbro 2016 Entertainment Plan presentation in August 2015, this movie was further teased by Rainbow Rocks co-director and Friendship Games director Ishi Rudell. When asked on Twitter if "we might get more #EquestriaGirls media of any kind", Rudell replied, "Yup, there's a pretty good chance." During a keynote presentation at MIPJunior 2015, Hasbro Studios president Stephen Davis confirmed that a fourth Equestria Girls film was in development at the time.

The movie's production started while Friendship Games was still being finished, lasted for a "little over a year and a half", and its completion was confirmed by Rudell in mid-August 2016. According to the movie's assistant director Katrina Hadley, there may have been "a small scene with" Lyra Heartstrings and Sweetie Drops "cut from the animatic".

Movie director Ishi Rudell credits Hadley and art director Jeremy Tin for designing the Crystal Gala dresses during "Legend You Were Meant To Be" but adds "it was a team effort".

This movie marks the return of Meghan McCarthy to the Equestria Girls franchise, albeit as co-executive producer. This is also the only Equestria Girls film not to involve Jayson Thiessen in any way as he was busy directing the 2017 My Little Pony movie, which was still in production at the time.

Music 

Like the previous three installments, the songs were composed by Daniel Ingram with lyric writing shared between Ingram and screenwriters Joanna Lewis and Kristine Songco; except "Embrace the Magic" which had lyrics by Lewis and Songco, and "Hope Shines Eternal" had lyrics by Ingram.
 "The Legend of Everfree" – Twilight Sparkle, Sunset Shimmer, Applejack, Fluttershy, Pinkie Pie, Rainbow Dash, Rarity, and ensemble (voiceover)
 "The Midnight in Me" – Twilight Sparkle
 "Embrace the Magic" - Sunset Shimmer
 "We Will Stand for Everfree" – Gloriosa Daisy
 "Legend You Were Meant to Be" – The Rainbooms
 "End Credits Song: Hope Shines Eternal" – The cast (voiceover)

Release

Marketing 
On July 7, 2016, a teaser trailer was published on YouTube depicting a slideshow of scenery backgrounds.

The movie's first official trailer was revealed by Entertainment Weekly on July 22, 2016. A shorter 30-second trailer was released on YouTube on August 1.

Television 
Before its United States release, the film premiered on September 24, 2016, on Discovery Kids Latin America. In the United States, the movie received a television premiere on Discovery Family on November 5, 2016.

Home media and streaming 

On October 1, 2016, the movie was made available for streaming on Netflix in the United States.

Legend of Everfree was released on DVD and Blu-ray on November 1, 2016, in the United States and Canada. Announced bonus features include audio commentary from the crew, a fictional two-minute "blooper reel" (which was published earlier onto YouTube on October 27, 2016), and sing-alongs.

Merchandise and other media 

The movie is a part of the camp-themed Legend of Everfree lineup, a fourth installment in the My Little Pony: Equestria Girls toy line and media franchise, first mentioned in a Hasbro 2016 Entertainment Plan presentation in August 2015 along with this movie. The toys were presented at the 2016 American International Toy Fair, and released in July 2016. LB Kids published a novelization of the movie, as well as a storybook adaptation, subtitled Save Our Camp!.

Soundtrack 
The movie's soundtrack was released on Google Play and iTunes on September 16, 2016. It was later released, freely, on Hasbro's YouTube channel on September 28, 2016.

Reception 
Legend of Everfree received mixed reviews from critics. Dakster Sullivan of GeekMom considered the movie's story underwhelming following her expectations of the trailer, calling it "less of one overall plot with a grand finale and more of a bunch of subplots that are tied together in the end". However, she added that the subplots "aren't badly written and are actually kind of fun to watch". ToonZone's Ed Liu discussed the movie's culmination of plot threads and "loose ends" from previous Equestria Girls movies, which he felt would be more suitable for a television series than a self-contained movie, opining "a certain lack of satisfaction by the time the end-credits roll". Francis Rizzo III of DVD Talk gave the movie's home release a score of 3.5 out of 5 stars, criticizing its lack of musical numbers and bonus content compared to previous Equestria Girls movies, but praising its humor, action sequences, and animation quality. On the movie's new characters, she called Gloriosa Daisy "a fine addition, with a different-enough energy to differentiate her from the characters seen in earlier films", while considering Timber Spruce "less engaging", noting the franchise's diminishment of male characters.

Awards and nominations

Notes

References

External links 

 

My Little Pony: Equestria Girls
2016 television films
2016 computer-animated films
2010s American animated films
2010s children's comedy films
2010s musical comedy films
2010s musical fantasy films
American children's animated adventure films
American children's animated comedy films
American children's animated fantasy films
American children's animated musical films
American fantasy adventure films
American flash animated films
American musical comedy films
American sequel films
Canadian animated feature films
Canadian animated fantasy films
Canadian children's fantasy films
Canadian fantasy adventure films
Canadian musical fantasy films
Canadian sequel films
2010s English-language films
Equestria Girls films
2010s fantasy adventure films
Film spin-offs
Films about shapeshifting
Films about summer camps
Hasbro Studios films
American musical fantasy films
DHX Media films
Magical girl films
2010s Canadian films